Balad al-Sheikh (traditional transliteration) or Balad ash-Shaykh (most recent form of transliteration) was a Palestinian Arab village located just north of Mount Carmel,  southeast of Haifa. Currently the town's land is located within the jurisdiction of the Israeli city, Nesher.

History

Ottoman era

The town is named after Sheikh Abdallah as-Sahli, a renowned Sufi, who was granted the taxes collected from the village by Sultan Salim II (1566-1574). The village contains a maqam ("shrine") dedicated to him. His grave is located in the Balad al-Sheikh cemetery on Mount Carmel.

In 1816, British traveller James Silk Buckingham passed by "Belled-el-Sheikh".

In 1859, the village had an estimated "200 souls", and the tillage was 20 feddans, while in 1875, Victor Guérin estimated that the village had a population of 500. He described that the houses were built by successive stages, one above the other; and almost all had a cabin made with tree branches at the top. This was where, during the summer, people spend the night to get cooler. Guérin further noted that at the lower end of the village were "cultivated gardens, surrounded by cactus and planted with olive, pomegranate and fig trees, and dominated by the elegant stems of several palm trees".

In 1881, the PEF's Survey of Western Palestine described it as "a moderate-sized village at the foot of Carmel, with good springs below near the road, and olive gardens with a few palm trees".

British Mandate era

In the 1922 census of Palestine, conducted by the British Mandate authorities, Balad al Shaikh had a population of 406; 405 Muslims and 1 Christian, where the one Christian was a Melkite. This had increasing in the 1931 census to 747 Muslims, including Bedouin tribes that lived nearby, in a total of 247 houses.

The Balad al-Sheikh Railway Station, also known as Shumariyyah (Şumariye in Turkish) and after 1948 as Tel Hanan, was built in 1904 as the second station in the original line. In 1913, the Ottomans built an extension of the valley line to Acre, with this station serving as terminus. When the Haganah attacked Balad al-Sheikh on the night of December 31, 1947 – January 1, 1948, Hanan Zelinger of the Haganah was killed in the operation. A Jewish village, Tel Hanan (now part of the town of Nesher), was built there in his name.

The village was the source of attacks on Jews in 1929 when its residents attacked the local cement factory and burned down a women's farm. In 1934, a new cemetery for Muslim residents of Haifa, was established near the village and in 1935 Izz ad-Din al-Qassam was buried there, making the area a source of tension between Jews and Arabs.

During the 1936–39 Arab revolt in Palestine, there were frequent attacks on Jewish passenger buses near Balad al-Sheikh. In May 1936, a police station was opened in Balad al-Sheikh in an attempt to crack down on the attacks on Jewish buses and property. On May 21, 1936, a Jewish bus was shot at when it was passing the village. In October 1936, an engagement between Arab militants and the British military, supported by aircraft, took place near the village. On February 22, 1937, two British policemen were attacked in the village, one was killed. It was stated that he was killed because he took part in the investigations of the murder of three Jews at Yagur in 1931.

Additional attacks on Jewish buses occurred from July to October 1938.

On July 13, 1938, two buses were shot and stoned; one of them was set on fire. On April 18, 1939, a wide military and police search was conducted in Balad esh Sheikh looking for the suspects of the killings in Haifa. A large number of Arabs were interrogated and ten were arrested.

On May 26, 1939, Mordechai Shechtman, a train driver, was shot in the head by two Arabs who ambushed him at the railroad switch stop near Balad-el Sheikh. He died soon thereafter.

According to the British Population Survey - Village Statistics, 1945, the town had a total land area of 9,849 Turkish dunams, although only 5,844 dunams were privately owned by Arabs; most of the remainder was public property. In 1945, the town had a population of 4,120 Muslim inhabitants making it one of the larger localities in the area. Of the land, Arabs used 386 dunams for plantations and irrigable land, 4,410 for cereals, while 221 dunams were built-up (urban) land.

1948 Arab–Israeli War

On December 10, 1947, a patrol of Jewish Settlement Police that was escorting Jewish buses on the road, fired on a number of Arabs that blocked the road near the village. Several families left the village.

Following the attacks, the Jewish transportation stopped for a while to travel through the village. The transportation from Haifa to Nesher, Yagur and Jezreel Valley travelled through Check Post junction, Krayot, Kfar Hasidim and Yagur.

On December 30, 1947, a grenade attack by Irgun killed 6 Arab civilians in front of the Haifa Oil Refinery, after which the Arab crowd went in and killed 39 Jewish refinery workers. During the night of the following day, Haganah troops entered the town disguised as Arabs and killed 14-60 during a firefight in which 3 Haganah members were also killed. According to Israeli historian Aryeh Yitzhaki, the attack was carried out by a combination of Palmach and Haganah forces who entered the town and fought mostly inside the houses, resulting in mostly non-combatant casualties. Following the attack, on January 7, 1948, part of the residents of the village left and were replaced by Arab volunteers who came from Haifa to defend the village.

In early April 1948, a unit of the Arab Legion that had garrisoned the village left the area. This led the villagers to abandon the houses in the southeastern part of the village, near the Legion camp and move to the village center.

On April 22, after the Battle of Haifa, the vast majority of Haifa's non-Jewish fled in attempt to avoid the violence of the Haganah and other armed Zionist militias. At the same time, many of Balad ash-Sheikh's residents left the village, including women and children.

On April 24, 1948, the Carmeli Brigade a unit of the Haganah surrounded the village, asking the residents to hand over all their weapons. They handed them 22 old and useless rifles and asked for ceasefire. The Haganah replied that they should hand over all their weapons. The residents did not reply, instead they asked the British Army for help. On April 25, at 05:00 AM, the Haganah fired several shells from three-inch mortars. Many adults male fled and left the women and children behind. A British army unit that came at 06:00 reported that there was almost no return fire from the village. The British advised the villagers to leave the village and they did it with British escort.

Present 

Most of the fleeing or exiled residents of Balad ash-Sheikh are internally displaced Palestinians and presently reside in various Arab neighborhoods in Haifa or Acre.

Walid Khalidi, a prominent Palestinian historian, described the town in 1992:

Many of the Arab houses and shops are still standing and are occupied by the settlement's inhabitants. The cemetery is visible and is in a state of neglect.

See also
 List of villages depopulated during the Arab-Israeli conflict

References

Bibliography

 
 
 
 
 
 
 
 
 
 
 Mülinen, Egbert Friedrich von 1908, Beiträge zur Kenntnis des Karmels "Separateabdruck aus der Zeitschrift des Deutschen Palëstina-Vereins Band XXX (1907) Seite 117-207 und Band XXXI (1908) Seite 1-258." Beled esch-schech: p.175 ff.
 
  p. 108-109

External links
 Welcome to Balad-al-Shaykh
 Balad al-Shaykh, Zochrot
Survey of Western Palestine, Map 5: IAA, Wikimedia commons
 Balad al-Shaykh, from the Khalil Sakakini Cultural Center

Arab villages depopulated prior to the 1948 Arab–Israeli War
District of Haifa